Ronald Naldo Ricketts, popularly known as Ronnie Ricketts, is a Filipino actor, scriptwriter, film director, line producer, and martial artist who is the former President of the Philippine Film Actors Guild, and former Chairman of Optical Media Board (OMB), a government agency that regulates recording optical media in the Philippines.

Film career
Ronnie Ricketts is a martial artist and was a ramp model before he entered the movie industry in the early 1980s. He was first noticed by RVQ's (Dolphy) film production as a potential action star.

He was introduced in the Dolphy-Nida Blanca film, My Heart Belongs to Daddy (1982), where he was paired with Maricel Soriano. He was being billed as the other love interest of Soriano in the film I Love You, I Hate You (1983), together with William Martinez, and The Graduates (1986) under Regal Films starring Snooky Serna and Gabby Concepcion.

He was cast in several Dolphy-Alma Moreno movies such as Good Morning, Professor (1982) and Crazy Professor (1985) with Aga Muhlach and Janice de Belen.

His movies were a blend of drama, comedy and action. He worked with other action stars that were also at the peak of their careers, Lito Lapid, Dante Varona and Bong Revilla. His unforgettable portrayal was with Revilla in the Imus Production's Sparrow Unit, where he won an award as Best Supporting Actor. He was nominated as Best Supporting Actor FAMAS Award in the film Target: Sparrow Unit (1987), and FAMAS Best Actor in the movies Tatak ng Isang Api (1989), and Isa-Isahin Ko Kayo (1990).

He landed lead roles in movies such as Uzi Brothers 9mm (1989) with Sonny Parsons, Target: Maganto (1989), Gapos Gang (1989), Baril Ko ang Uusig (1990), and Matira ang Matibay (1995) to name a few, some of which he did with his own movie outfit, Rocketts Productions. He had the chance to play opposite many leading ladies such as Beverly Vergel, Vina Morales, and his real life partner, Mariz.

Ricketts also co-starred in international action movies with Taiwanese actress Cynthia Khan in Ultimate Revenge (1995) and Angel on Fire (1995) and with American Actor Burton Richardson in One Percent Full (2007).

In 1994, Ricketts started producing films through Rocketts Productions. He was one of the youngest producers in tinsel town, who was able to produce films at reasonable budgets. The company produced films which he himself wrote, directed and acted in along with members of his family. 

In one of his projects, Mano Mano (1995), he wrote the script, played the lead role, directed and produced. He was credited as Ronn-Rick as the director of the film. There were two sequels to the film - Mano Mano 2 (2001) and Mano Mano 3 (2004).

He has received the Fernando Poe, Jr. Memorial Award and a star in the Walk of Fame in Eastwood.

In 2013, he starred on the film The Fighting Chefs in which he was also its director. It served as his film comeback.

As Optical Media Board (OMB) chairman
On October 21, 2009, former President Gloria Macapagal Arroyo, appointed Ricketts as the Chairman of the Optical Media Board (OMB) following the resignation of television host Edu Manzano.

He received many awards and recognitions with his staff for his excellent performance as chairman of OMB, like Face of the Global Anti-Piracy of TFC-ABS-CBN, Certificate of Recognition on Anti-Piracy from the FAMAS, Intellectual Property Office of the Philippines-IPR Enforcement Champion, MMDA Achievement Award, SM Cinema Certificate of Recognition Association of Video Distributors in the Philippines (AVIDPHIL), Motion Picture Anti-Film Piracy Council, Certificate of Recognition Upholding Anti-Piracy, and Plaque of Recognition Against Piracy from PARI and AWIT Awards.

Ricketts agreed to direct and appear in an action movie with Viva Films on condition that he would only shoot on weekends so as not to hamper his job as chairman of Optical Media Board. He has so far turned down offers to appear in shows on the three major networks - ABS-CBN 2, GMA 7 and TV5 - because his work with the OMB "has now become a passion."

2010 Sky High raid, suspension, conviction and acquittal
On May 27, 2010, the OMB initiated a raid on the Sky High Marketing Corporation offices in Quiapo, Manila (the district where flea market stalls selling pirated copies of films, television shows and songs in CD [includes VCD] and DVD optical disc formats are common, designated by the Office of the United States Trade Representative [USTR] as "notorious piracy hotspot"), arresting three Chinese nationals. Pirated DVDs and VCDs contained in 127 boxes and two sacks were seized, and were brought to the OMB office as evidence. However, later that evening, Ricketts instructed the evidence's pull-out using the raided corporation's own truck, without an approved gate pass. No charges were filed against Sky High Marketing.

In August 2014, Ombudsman Conchita Carpio-Morales ordered the suspension of Ricketts, Executive Director Cyrus Paul Valenzuela, and three other OMB officials for their "neglect of duty". In June 2015, Prosecutor Janet Cabigas-Vejerano formally filed charges of graft against the five officials for their illicit returning of pirated works. Valenzuela later denied being part of the pullout, stating that he was included in the case only because of the presumption that he, as executive director, would know about every OMB operation. Despite the indictment, Ricketts continued to serve as chairman of OMB until January 2016, when the Sandiganbayan suspended him and three others (not including Valenzuela) from their positions while their trial is on hold and replaced by lawyer Anselmo B. Adriano.

On March 15, 2019, Ricketts was found guilty of graft by the Sandiganbayan and sentenced to prison for six to eight years, though he immediately posted a bail bond after the decision. For the other three officials, one was convicted while two were acquitted due to insufficient evidence.

In a decision promulgated last March 16, 2022 but made public only on July 28, 2022 the Supreme Court (SC) has overturned a Sandiganbayan ruling and acquitted actor and former chair and chief executive officer of the Optical Media Board (OMB) Ronald “Ronnie” Ricketts of graft charges.

the SC decision penned by Associate Justice Ricardo R. Rosario ruled that “The appeal of Ricketts is meritorious. We find that the evidence against him is mere hearsay. The prosecution failed to prove his participation in the crime beyond reasonable doubt.” 

In reversing the anti-graft court’s decision, the SC stressed that it has always supported the government’s efforts to stamp out graft and corruption in the service.

“However, from the evidence adduced by the prosecution, the Court finds that no clear nexus exists to prove a unity of action and purpose between and among Ricketts and Perez to give unwarranted benefit to a private party resulting in damage to the government. Therefore, Ricketts should have been acquitted and the case against him dismissed. After a judicious examination of the records and submissions of the parties in this case, the Court finds that the facts and evidence presented by the prosecution failed to prove the guilt of Ricketts beyond reasonable doubt,” the SC held.

“Wherefore, the appeal of Ronald N. Ricketts is granted, and the Decision dated March 15, 2019 of the Sandiganbayan (Special Fourth Division) in Case No. SB-15-CRM-0132 for violation of Section 3(e) of Republic Act No. 3019, and its Resolution dated November 15, 2019 denying reconsideration thereof, are affirmed with modification. Accused-appellant Ronald N. Ricketts is acquitted for failure of the prosecution to prove conspiracy and his guilt of the offense charged beyond reasonable doubt,” the SC said.

The SC also lifted the hold departure order issued against Ricketts and set aside and his cash bond is released, subject to the usual accounting and auditing procedures.

“Let entry of judgment with respect to Ronald N. Ricketts be issued immediately. So ordered,” the SC added.

https://manilastandard.net/news/national/314247806/sc-overturns-sandigan-clears-ricketts-of-graft.html

Martial arts career
Ricketts started training martial arts at the age of 5 under the guidance and tutelage of his eldest brother the late Grand Master Christopher "Topher" Ricketts. He studied different forms of martial arts ranging from Okinawan karate, Budokan karate, Kūdō, Ngo Cho Kung-fu, boxing and then later transitioned to Filipino martial arts (FMA) where he was immersed to intensive trainings of Kali, Arnis and Sagasa Kickboxing.

He adapted the Sagasa method of Kali and Arnis that was developed by GM Christopher "Topher" Ricketts, a style that focused on powerful and direct strikes combined with boxing, kickboxing, striking, throwing and grappling. He was also personally trained by Lameco Eskrima founder GM Edgar Sulite.

As a lifelong martial artist Ricketts is an advocate of continuous learning where he shared during his Facebook live feed that he is also training modern day martial arts like Brazilian Jiu-jitsu (BJJ) and mixed martial arts (MMA).

Ricketts is a senior and one of the first generation member of Bakbakan International, a martial arts organization founded by his brother GM Topher Ricketts.

Currently Ricketts is continuing the legacy and preserving the style of the Sagasa martial arts system where he teaches it with an incorporation of modern-day martial arts to new generation of martial artists, MMA fighters, military and law enforcement agencies. He is also sharing self-defense and martial arts techniques in social media and internet streaming platforms through his YouTube channel Ricketts TV.
 
In 2004, Ricketts, Grand Master Topher Ricketts and Punong Guro Bruce Ricketts were given recognition by the US and Philippine Special Forces - Joint Task Force after sharing combative lessons to Philippine and American soldiers.

Filmography

Film

*Written and directed by Ricketts under the name Ronn Rick.

Television

1985 - Mother Studio Presents (GMA 7)
1986 - Herederos (RPN 9)
1987 - Lovingly Yours, Helen (GMA 7)
1988 - Squad 13 (IBC 13)
1988 - Ang Tabi Kong Mamaw (IBC 13)
1988 - Agila (RPN 9)
1989 - Maricel Drama Special (ABS-CBN)
1990 - Valiente (ABS-CBN)
1991 - Maalaala Mo Kaya (ABS-CBN)
1993 - GMA Telecine Specials (GMA 7)
1995 - Mikee (GMA 7)
1995 - Haybol Rambol (GMA 7)
1997 - GMA True Stories (GMA 7)
1998 - Calvento Files (ABS-CBN)
1999 - !Oka Tokat (ABS-CBN)
1999 - Kapag May Katwiran, Ipaglaban Mo! (ABS-CBN)
2000 - Pintados (GMA 7)
2005 - Magpakailanman (GMA 7)
2006 - Kamao (ABS-CBN)
2007 - Asian Treasures (GMA 7)
2008 - Zaido: Pulis Pangkalawakan (GMA 7)
2008 - Codename: Asero (GMA 7)
2010 - True Confessions (TV5)
2013 - Tunay Na Buhay (GMA 7)
2014 - Dream Dad (ABS-CBN)
2015 - Sabado Badoo (GMA 7)
2017 - Eat Bulaga - Jackpot N Poy (GMA 7)
2017 - The Lola's Beautiful Show (GMA 7)
2018 - It's Showtime (ABS-CBN) - Magpasikat judge with wife Ms. Mariz Ricketts
2019 - Arnold Clavio Show (GMA 7)
2019 - Moments (Net 25)
2019 - Wowowin (GMA 7)
2021 - Ang Probinsyano (Kapamilya Channel)

References

External links

"Ronnie Ricketts at www.pinoy-showbiz.biz/celebrity_profile/ronnie_ricketts.html"
"Naldo Ricketts at www.naldoricketts.com/rockets.html"

Living people
ABS-CBN personalities
American male actors of Filipino descent
Arroyo administration personnel
Bicolano actors
Bicolano people
Filipino eskrimadors
Filipino film directors
Filipino martial artists
Filipino people of American descent
GMA Network personalities
Heads of government agencies of the Philippines
Male actors from Manila
People convicted of corruption
Year of birth missing (living people)